USNS Harvey Milk (T-AO-206) is the second of the  of underway replenishment oilers, operated by the Military Sealift Command (MSC) to support ships of the United States Navy.

In July 2016, Ray Mabus, then United States Secretary of the Navy, advised Congress that he intended to name the John Lewis-class oilers after prominent civil rights leaders, with this ship to be named in honor of gay rights activist Harvey Milk.

The ship was officially named at a ceremony in San Francisco on 16 August 2016.  She is the first US Navy ship named for an openly gay person.

Namesake
Milk served in the US Navy during the Korean War aboard , a submarine rescue ship, and held the rank of lieutenant (junior grade). In 1955, he was forced to resign and accept an "other than honorable" discharge, rather than face a court martial for his homosexuality.

Construction
Building got underway for John Lewis in 2018 at General Dynamics NASSCO in San Diego. 

The first cut of steel for Harvey Milk occurred on 13 December 2019, marking the beginning of construction of the vessel. 

The ship had her christening ceremony and was then launched on 6 November 2021, with Milk's nephew Stuart Milk, Navy Secretary Carlos Del Toro, and the ship's sponsor, prominent LBGTQ activist Paula Neira, in attendance.

See also

  - predecessor class

References

Harvey Milk
John Lewis-class oilers
Tankers of the United States Navy